The 2018 PFF Women's League season is the second season of the women's national league of the Philippines following the 2016–17 season.

The organization of a second season for the league was reported as early as July 2018. Ten clubs participated for the second season which will run from August 25 to November 11 2018, with De La Salle Zobel and Tuloy F.C. making their debuts.

The University of Santo Tomas and the De La Salle University played against each other in the de facto final on November 11, 2018 where the latter won 2–1 over the former.

Format
The league followed a single round robin format for the second season. Matches are to be played on weekends. The primary venue for the league's matches is the PFF National Training Centre in Carmona, Cavite with the Rizal Memorial Stadium designated as an alternate venue. As of this season the league's players reportedly are compliant with the MyPFF online registration system of the Philippine Football Federation.

Clubs
10 teams participated in the second season of the league with De La Salle Zobel and Tuloy F.C. making their debuts. 2016–17 season participants, Fuego España and The Younghusband Football Academy decided not to enter for this season.

League table

Results
Format: Single round robin

Honors
Individual award
Most Valuable Player:  Chelo Hodges (De La Salle)
Best Goalkeeper:  Natasha Lacson (De La Salle)
Best Defender:  Mariell Tejada (De La Salle)
Best Midfielder:  Hazel Lustan (UST)
Golden Boot:  Isabella Bandoja (Tuloy) with 24 goals

Team
Fair Play Award: Tuloy F.C.

References

PFF Women's League
Philippines
PFF Women's League seasons
PFF Women's League